The Pilot-Tribune & Enterprise is a local weekly newspaper from Blair, Nebraska.  The paper has roots back to its founding in 1929, when it was formed by the union of local papers the Blair Pilot and the Tribune.

See also
 List of newspapers in Nebraska

References

External links
 Pilot-Tribune & Enterprise official website

Newspapers published in Nebraska
Washington County, Nebraska
1929 establishments in Nebraska